Bjarne Solbakken (born 18 May 1977) is a retired Norwegian alpine skier from Stranda who has competed at the Olympics, World Championships and the World Cup.

Olympics
Solbakken participated at the 2002 Winter Olympics in Salt Lake City, where he finished fifth in super-G, sixth in giant slalom and twelfth in downhill. At the 2006 Winter Olympics in Turin he competed in downhill, super-G and giant slalom, with a twentieth place in giant slalom as best result.

World championships
At the FIS Alpine World Ski Championships 2007 he competed in super-G, downhill and giant slalom.

World Cup
He participated in the Alpine skiing World Cup in 2003/2004, 2004/2005 and 2005/2006. His best result was at the 2004 Alpine Skiing World Cup, when he finished fourth overall in super-G, with one victory, in Beaver Creek, and one second place at Kvitfjell. He left in the summer of 2008 to pursue studies.

References

1977 births
Norwegian male alpine skiers
Alpine skiers at the 2002 Winter Olympics
Alpine skiers at the 2006 Winter Olympics
Olympic alpine skiers of Norway
Sportspeople from Møre og Romsdal
People from Stranda
Living people